Trachydora oxypeuces is a moth in the family Cosmopterigidae. It is found in Australia, where it has been recorded from Tasmania.

References

Natural History Museum Lepidoptera generic names catalog

Trachydora
Moths of Australia